The 1977–78 BBC2 Floodlit Trophy was the thirteenth occasion on which the BBC2 Floodlit Trophy competition had been held. This year there was another new name added when Hull Kingston Rovers won the trophy by beating St. Helens in the final by the score of 26-11. The match was played at Craven Park (1), in Hull,  East Riding of Yorkshire. The attendance was 10,099, and the  receipts were £6,586.

Background 
The Rugby Football League's BBC2 Floodlit Trophy was a knock-out competition sponsored by the BBC and between rugby league clubs, entrance to which was conditional upon the club having floodlights. Most matches were played on an evening, and those of which the second half was televised, were played on a Tuesday evening.
Despite the competition being named as 'Floodlit', many matches took place during the afternoons and not under floodlights, and several of the entrants, including  Barrow and Bramley did not have adequate lighting. And, when in 1973, due to the world oil crisis, the government restricted the use of floodlights in sport, all the matches, including the Trophy final, had to be played in the afternoon rather than at night.
The Rugby League season always (until the onset of "Summer Rugby" in 1996) ran from around August-time through to around May-time and this competition always took place early in the season, in the Autumn, with the final taking place in December (The only exception to this was when disruption of the fixture list was caused by inclement weather)

Competition and results 
This season Bramley, winners in 1973, did not enter the competition (they returned next year), but Batley joined the  competition; thus the number of entrants remaining the same at twenty-two. The format remained as a knock-out competition from the preliminary round through to the  final. The preliminary round involved twelve clubs, to reduce the numbers taking part in the  competition proper to just sixteen.

Preliminary round 
Involved  6 matches and 12 clubs

Round 1 – first round 
Involved  8 matches and 16 clubs

Round 1 – first round – replay 
Involved  8 matches and 16 clubs

Round 2 – quarter finals 
Involved 4 matches with 8 clubs

Round 3 – semi-finals  
Involved 2 matches and 4 clubs

Final

Teams and scorers 

Scoring - Try = three (3) points - Goal = two (2) points - Drop goal = two (2) points

The road to success 
This tree excludes any preliminary round fixtures

Notes 
1 * Batley join the competition and play first game in the competition, and first at home in the competition. It was also their one and only game as they did not enter the competition again
2 * At the  time this highest score and greatest winning margin, never to be beaten
3 * This match was televised
4 * Abandoned after 25 Minutes due to Fog - Second Half was due to be Live on BBC 2
5  * Craven Park (1) was the home ground of Hull Kingston Rovers from 2 September 1922 to 9 April 1989. The final capacity was estimated to be under 10,000 although the record attendance was 22,282 set on 7 October 1922 in a match against local rivals Hull FC. The stadium was demolished in 1989 and a new supermarket constructed for the Co-op, and now occupied by Morrisons.

See also 
1977–78 Northern Rugby Football League season
1977 Lancashire Cup
1977 Yorkshire Cup
BBC2 Floodlit Trophy
Rugby league county cups

References

External links
Saints Heritage Society
1896–97 Northern Rugby Football Union season at wigan.rlfans.com 
Hull&Proud Fixtures & Results 1896/1897
Widnes Vikings - One team, one passion Season In Review - 1896-97
The Northern Union at warringtonwolves.org
Huddersfield R L Heritage

BBC2 Floodlit Trophy
BBC2 Floodlit Trophy